Matuta planipes is a species of moon crab in the family Matutidae. It is a small colorful crab with flattened limbs. The Matuta planipes, in contrast to other species of crabs inhale pure oxygen-water through an area near their eye sockets. This species of crabs enjoy spending their daytime hidden under some sort of shade such as a sand bed and they are more active during the night.
This species of crab comes from the tropical waters of the Indo-Pacific and Australia. Additionally, they have a widespread distribution that extends from the Red Sea to South Africa, Asia, and Australia.

References

Calappoidea
Crustaceans described in 1798

Saher, N. U., Amanat, Z., Gondal, M. A., & Qureshi, N. A. (2017, January 31). Distribution, Abundance and Population Ecology of Ashtoret lunaris (Forskel, 1775) and Matuta planipes Fabricius, 1798 from the Sonmiani Bay (Lagoon), Pakistan. Retrieved March 16, 2023, from http://dx.doi.org/10.17582/journal.pjz/2017.49.2.455.465